Daniel Henchman (November 23, 1730 – January 7, 1775) was a noted colonial American silversmith, active in Boston, Massachusetts. He was born in Lynn, Massachusetts as the son of Rev. Nathaniel Henchman, apprenticed to silversmith Jacob Hurd, and married Elizabeth Hurd on March 20, 1753. Henchman advertised in the Boston Evening Post, January 4, 1773, and again in the New England Chronicle for June 12, 1773: "Daniel Henchman Takes this Method to inform his customers in Town and Country That ... he makes with his own Hands all Kinds of large and small Plate Work, in the genteelest Taste and Newest Fashion, and of the purest Silver; and ... he flatters himself that he shall have the Preference by those who are best Judges of Work, to those Strangers among us who import and sell English Plate to the great Hurt and Prejudice of the Townsmen who have been bred to the Business... Said Henchman therefore will engage to those Gentlemen and Ladies who shall please to employ him, that he will make any kind of Plate they may want equal in goodness and cheaper than they can import from London, with the greatest Dispatch."

References 

 American Silver: The Work of Seventeenth and Eighteenth Century Silversmiths, Exhibited at the Museum of Fine Arts, June to November, 1906, Museum of Fine Arts, Boston, 1906, pages 24–25.
 R. W. Norton Art Gallery: Daniel Henchman
 American Silversmiths
 Collectors Weekly Flashback:	The Burts, Boston Silversmiths, by Thomas Hamilton Ormsbee, March 20, 2009.

American silversmiths